Frane Tomislav Kojić (born 8 January 1992) is a Croatian table tennis player. He competed in the 2020 Summer Olympics for Croatia.

References

1992 births
Living people
Croatian male table tennis players
Olympic table tennis players of Croatia
Table tennis players at the 2020 Summer Olympics
21st-century Croatian people